Wisangocaris is an extinct genus of Cambrian arthropod known from the Emu Bay Shale of Australia. Due to the fact that trilobite fragments have been found its stomach, it was probably durophagous. It been placed in the family Sanctacarididae alongside Sanctacaris as stem-group chelicerates.

References 

Prehistoric chelicerate genera
Fossil taxa described in 2016